Mercat may refer to:

 Mercat cross
 Mercat Press

Characters:

 Mercat, a character in the series Gabby's Dollhouse

See also 
 Market (disambiguation)
 Mercator (disambiguation)
 Meerkat